Piyangala Aranya Senasanaya or Piyangala Forest Hermitage (Sinhalaː පියංගල ආරණ්‍ය සේනාසනය) is an ancient Buddhist temple in Ampara, Sri Lanka. The temple has been formally recognised by the Government as an archaeological site in Sri Lanka.

History
It is believed that this temple was constructed first century BC by the queen Rajitha who was a wife of king Dutugamunu. The temple consists of number of drip ledged caves with Brahmi inscriptions and ruins in its premises. Two of the inscriptions detail the donation of caves by Rajithaa, and a daughter of King Dutugamunu who was married to Parumaka Duta. According to the former archaeological commissioner, professor Senarath Paranavithana, these two inscriptions possess great importance as they contain rare information about the queens and children of king Dutugamunu.

Gallery

References

Notes

 

Buddhist temples in Ampara District
Buddhist caves in Sri Lanka
Archaeological protected monuments in Ampara District